Sir John Collings Squire (2 April 1884 – 20 December 1958) was a British writer, most notable as editor of the London Mercury, a major literary magazine in the interwar period. He antagonised several eminent authors, but attracted a coterie that was dubbed the Squirearchy. He was also a poet and historian, who captained a famous literary cricket-team called the Invalids.

Biography 
Born in Plymouth, he was educated at Blundell's School and St. John's College, Cambridge. He was one of those published in the Georgian poetry collections of Edward Marsh. His own Selections from Modern Poets anthology series, launched in 1921, became definitive of the conservative style of Georgian poetry.

He began reviewing for The New Age; through his wife he had met Alfred Orage. His literary reputation was first made by a flair for parody, in a column Imaginary Speeches in The New Age from 1909.

His poetry from World War I was satirical; at the time he was reviewing for the New Statesman, using the name Solomon Eagle (taken from a Quaker of the seventeenth century) – one of his reviews from 1915 was of The Rainbow by D. H. Lawrence. Squire had been appointed literary editor when the New Statesman was set up in 1912; he was noted as an adept and quick journalist, at ease with contributing to all parts of the journal. He was acting editor of the New Statesman in 1917–18, when Clifford Sharp was in the British Army, and more than competently sustained the periodical. When the war ended he found himself with a network of friends and backers, controlling a substantial part of London's literary press.

From 1919 to 1934, Squire was the editor of the monthly periodical, the London Mercury. It showcased the work of the Georgian poets and was an important outlet for new writers. Alec Waugh described the elements of Squire's 'hegemony' as acquired largely by accident, consequent on his rejection for military service for bad sight. Squire's natural persona was of a beer-drinking, cricketing West Countryman; his literary cricket XI, the Invalids (originally made up of men who had been wounded in the First World War), were immortalised in A. G. Macdonell's England, Their England, with Squire as Mr. William Hodge, editor of the London Weekly. In July 1927 he became an early radio commentator on Wimbledon.

In his book If It Had Happened Otherwise (1931) he collected a series of essays, many of which could be considered alternative histories, from some of the leading historians of the period (including Hilaire Belloc and Winston Churchill); in America it was published that same year in somewhat different form under the title If: or, History Rewritten.

Squire was knighted in 1933, and after leaving the London Mercury in 1934, he became a reader for Macmillans, the publishers; in 1937, he became a reviewer for the Illustrated London News.

His eldest son was Raglan Squire, an architect known for his work at Rangoon University in the 1950s, as the architect for the conversion of the houses in Eaton Sq, London into flats thus ensuring the preservation of that great London Square, and many buildings including offices and hotels in the Middle East and elsewhere.  His second son was Antony Squire, a pilot film director (The Sound Barrier).  His third son Maurice was killed in the Second War while his youngest daughter Julia Baker (née Squire) was a costume designer for theatre and cinema.  She married the actor George Baker.

Squire was an expert on Stilton cheese. He also loathed Jazz music, having filed a complaint with BBC radio to demand it stop playing Benny Goodman's music, which he called "an awful series of jungle noises which can hearten no man."

Politics

Squire had joined the Marxist Social Democratic Federation, as a young man. During his time at the New Statesman he wrote as a "Fabian liberal". In the 1918 general election he was the Labour  candidate for the Cambridge University seat. His views then moved steadily rightwards.

Squire met Benito Mussolini in 1933, and was one of the founders of the January Club, set up on 1 January 1934. He held in it the position of chairman or Secretary, and claimed that it was not a Fascist organisation. It was a dining club with invited speakers, and was closely connected to Oswald Mosley's British Union of Fascists, which nominated members. According to the historian Sir Charles Petrie (who, like Squire, wrote regularly for the Illustrated London News), Squire "found the atmosphere uncongenial before long".

Reputation

The Bloomsbury group named the coterie of writers that surrounded Squire as the Squirearchy. Alan Pryce-Jones was Squire's assistant on the Mercury and wrote

In a fairly recent study, the academic Leonard Diepeveen explored the particularly strained relationship between Squire and literary Modernists:

Squire is generally credited with the one-liner "I am not so think as you drunk I am", which appeared as the refrain of his Ballade of Soporific Absorption.

T. S. Eliot accused Squire of using the London Mercury to saturate literary London with journalistic and popular criticism. According to Robert H. Ross

John Middleton Murry took an adversarial line towards Squire, seeing his London Mercury as in direct competition with his own The Athenaeum. Roy Campbell sometimes mocked Squire in verse.

Since his death the reputation of Squire has declined; scholarship has absorbed the strictures of his contemporaries, such as F. S. Flint, openly critical of Squire in 1920. Squire is now considered to be on the "blimpish" wing of the reaction to modernist work.

A reappraisal of the periodical network of early twentieth-century literary London, and problems with the term modernism, have encouraged scholars to cast their nets beyond the traditional venue of modernism – the little magazine – to seek to better understand the role mass-market periodicals such as the London Mercury played in promoting new and progressive writers.

Archives 
Papers of Sir John Collings Squire are held at the Cadbury Research Library, University of Arts,London.

Bibliography
 Socialism and Art (1907 - under the name Jack C. Squire)
 Poems and Baudelaire flowers (1909)
 Imaginary Speeches And Other Parodies in Prose And Verse (1912)
 William the Silent (1912)
 Steps to Parnassus: and other parodies & diversions (1913)
 The Three Hills and Other Poems (1913)
 The Survival of the Fittest: and other poems (1916)
 Twelve poems (1916)
 The Lily of Malud and Other Poems (1917)
 The Gold Tree (1917)
 Books in general (1919)
 Poems: First Series (1919)
 The Moon (1920)
 Books in general: Second Series (1920)
 The Birds and Other Poems (1920)
 Tricks of the trade (1920)
 Books in general: Third Series (1921)
 Selections From Modern Poets (1921)
 The Collected Poems of James Elroy Flecker (1921)
 A Book of Women's Verse (1921)
 Collected Parodies (1921)
 Poems: Second Series (1921)
 Life and letters: essays (1921)
 Books reviewed (1922)
 Essays at Large (1922)
 Poems about birds: from the Middle Ages to the present day (1922)
 American poems, and others (1923)
 Essays on Poetry (1923)
 The Grub Street Nights Entertainments (1924)
 Poems in One Volume (1926)
 The Cambridge Book of Lesser Poets (1927)
 Robin Hood: a farcical romantic pastoral (1928)
 Apes and Parrots: An Anthology of Parodies (1929)
 Life at the Mermaid (1930)
 If It Had Happened Otherwise (1931)
 Younger poets of to-day (1932)
 A face in candlelight: & other poems (1932)
 Flowers of speech: being lectures in words and forms in literature (1935)
 Reflections and memories (1935)
 Shakespeare as a Dramatist (1935)
 Water-Music: Or a Fortnight of Bliss (1939)
 Collected Poems (1959)

References

Further reading

Patrick Howarth, Squire: Most Generous of Men, Hutchinson (London 1963)

External links

 
 
 
 Portraits of J. C. Squire at the National Portrait Gallery
 

Writers from Plymouth, Devon
1884 births
1958 deaths
People educated at Blundell's School
Alumni of St John's College, Cambridge
British literary editors
English literary critics
English male poets
20th-century English poets
Knights Bachelor
Labour Party (UK) parliamentary candidates
20th-century English male writers
Members of the Fabian Society
English male non-fiction writers